Stenanthemum yorkense is a species of flowering plant in the family Rhamnaceae and is endemic to an area near York in the southwest of Western Australia. It is a low, spreading shrub with egg-shaped leaves, the narrower end towards the base, and densely crowded, head-like clusters  of white, tube-shaped flowers with a yellow centre.

Description

Taxonomy and naming
Stenanthemum yorkense was first formally described in 2007 by Barbara Lynette Rye in the journal Nuytsia from specimens collected near York in 2005. The specific epithet (yorkense) refers to the type location.

Distribution and habitat
This species is only known from a single hill or hills on private land near York, where a large populations grows on quartzite under Eucalyptus accedens and Allocasuarina trees.

Conservation status
Stenanthemum yorkense is listed as "Priority One" by the Government of Western Australia Department of Biodiversity, Conservation and Attractions, meaning that it is known from only one or a few locations which are potentially at risk.

References

yorkense
Rosales of Australia
Flora of Western Australia
Plants described in 2007
Taxa named by Barbara Lynette Rye